Cyril Kitchener Harris (19 September 1936 – 13 September 2005) was Chief Rabbi of The Union of Orthodox Synagogues of South Africa from 1987 to 2004.

Harris was born in Glasgow, Scotland.  During his tenure as Chief Rabbi, he was noted for his support of full democracy during South Africa's apartheid years. He spoke at the induction ceremony of President Nelson Mandela in 1994, and also gave a blessing at Mandela's wedding to Graça Machel in 1998.  Mandela frequently referred to Harris as "my rabbi."

He trained at the Jews College, and served suburban congregations in Kenton and Edgware and finally St John's Wood from 1979. From 1966 to 1971, Harris also served as Senior Jewish Chaplain to the British Armed Forces. Ahead of the 1991 retirement of British Chief Rabbi Immanuel Jakobovits, Harris was shortlisted as a potential successor. Ultimately, Rabbi Jonathan Sacks was appointed to the position. 

He later went on to become one of the founders of Afrika Tikkun which is a South African-based NPO that focuses on the Holistic Development of young people in disadvantaged townships of the country. They focus on the Holistic Development of young people ages 2 – 35 years and provide them with education, family support services, primary health care, and food and nutrition services.

He died in Hermanus, Western Cape, South Africa, aged 68, and was buried in Israel.
The Chief Rabbi CK Harris Memorial Foundation  was established to continue his legacy.  For the fifteen years that followed, the Foundation assisted many organisations, within both the Jewish and broader communities, to train professional staff in fields in which Rabbi Harris "had a special interest and affection".

References 

1936 births
2005 deaths
20th-century rabbis
21st-century rabbis
Alumni of the London School of Jewish Studies
Deaths from cancer in South Africa
Chief rabbis of South Africa
Clergy from Glasgow
Scottish Orthodox rabbis